Kajkowo  (former Polish name: Bukwałd) is a village in the administrative district of Gmina Ostróda, within Ostróda County, Warmian-Masurian Voivodeship, in northern Poland.

The village has a population of 1,017.

References

Kajkowo